Sinicki (feminine: Sinicka) is a Polish surname. Notable people with the surname include:

 Christine Sinicki (born 1960), American politician
 Tim Sinicki, American college baseball coach

Polish-language surnames